Richmond and Chesapeake Bay Railway Car Barn is a historic interurban car barn located in Richmond, Virginia. It was built by the Richmond and Chesapeake Bay Railway in 1907. It is a one-story, gable-roofed, T-plan building with a steel frame clad with corrugated steel panels. A one-story transformer station was added to the east side of the building in the 1920s.

It was listed on the National Register of Historic Places in 2006.

References

Railway buildings and structures on the National Register of Historic Places in Virginia
Buildings and structures completed in 1907
Buildings and structures in Richmond, Virginia
National Register of Historic Places in Richmond, Virginia
Railway buildings and structures on the National Register of Historic Places
Industrial buildings and structures on the National Register of Historic Places in Virginia